Sefton High School is a government-funded co-educational dual modality partially academically selective and comprehensive secondary day school, located in Sefton, a suburb in western Sydney, New South Wales, Australia. Established in 1962, the school caters for approximately 1,100, students from Year 7 to Year 12 and is operated by the New South Wales Department of Education.

Overview 
Sefton High School is involved in extracurricular activities including sport, the vocal group, debating and history debating. Recreational sports offered throughout the year incorporate: yoga, theatre sports, soccer, volleyball, basketball, bocce-lawn bowls, ten pin bowling, chess, mini-tennis, table tennis, lawn tennis, dance and swimming.

In the lower four grades (Years 7 through to 10), approximately half of the students are selected by an entrance examination (selective) while the other half are accepted by virtue of local residency (community). However, in Years 11 and 12, the two streams are not differentiated.

History
Sefton High School received its first students on 30 January 1961. It was at first planned as "Chester Hill High School". The plan was changed, however, and eventually a separate school was established in the nearby suburb of Chester Hill now called Chester Hill High School.

Campus
The school grounds cover almost an entire block along Hector Street. In addition, there is a hall/gymnasium, an industrial arts building, a canteen and six major classroom blocks alphabetically named from A to G. In 2005, a new building was opened (C Block). It contains a library which includes four classrooms, a computer area, a studying area, a computer room and a multi-media room and an administration area.

Notable alumni 

 Mahnaz Angury – ABC journalist
 Professor Robert Bartelshead of School of Economics and former head of School of Business, University of Sydney
 Sabrina HoussamiMiss World Australia 2006
 Terry Lambrugby league footballer who played in the 1980s and 1990s, and coached on the 2000s
 Rebecca Ripponwater polo player and Bronze Medal Olympian
 Sally Sitou  Australian Labor Party member for Reid
 Stevie WrightThe Easybeats vocalist
 George YoungThe Easybeats guitarist

See also 

 List of government schools in New South Wales
 List of selective high schools in New South Wales

References 

Public high schools in Sydney
Selective schools in New South Wales
Educational institutions established in 1961
1961 establishments in Australia